Gunhild Kyle (28 August 1921 – 14 February 2016) was a Swedish historian. She was Sweden's first professor of women's history at the University of Gothenburg.

Early life and education
Gunhild Karlson was born on 28 August 1921 in Gothenburg, the daughter of sales manager Gunnar Karlson and his wife, Karin (Lundstedt). She completed a master's degree in Gothenburg in 1950, became a Licentiate of Philosophy in 1970, earned her Doctor of Philosophy in 1972, and became a docent in 1979.

Career
Kyle was an assistant professor at Vasa municipal girls' school in Gothenburg, and at a high school in Partille. She served as a senior lecturer at high school in Stenungsund before becoming, in 1984, Sweden's first professor of women's history at the University of Gothenburg, where she worked until 1987/1988, after which she became professor emerita. She is the author of Svenska flickskolor under 1800-talet  ("Swedish girls' schools during the 19th century") (1970; thesis with the same name in 1972) and Gäst-arbeterska i manssamhället ("Guest workers in the men's society") (1979), and well as essays in various journals.

Personal life
In 1946–1974, she married associate professor, Per Gunnar Kyle (1919–2006). Since 1974, she was a partner with Professor Gunnar Qvist (1916–1980). She is the mother of the historian, Doctor Jörgen Kyle (born 1950) and actor Sissela Kyle (born 1957). Kyle died on 14 February 2016 in Stockholm.

Selected works
 Svensk flickskola under 1800-talet., 1970
 Två studier i den svenska flickskolans historia, 1972
 Kvinnorna i männens samhälle. Ur den officiella debatten om kvinnans villkor i Sverige. ([Edited by] Gunhild Kyle, Gunnar Qvist.)., 1974
 Klassbildning och kvinnobildning.
 Gästarbeterska i manssamhället : studier om industriarbetande kvinnors villkor i Sverige, 1979
 Kvinnan under 1900-talet - konflikten mellan produktion och reproduktion. , 1980
 Kultur kring kvinnobildning
 Kvinnors liv i det svenska samhället : tio forskningsprojekt stödda av Riksbankens jubileumsfond, 1981
 Kvinnohistoria. Del 1 : Kvinnohistoria i forskning och skolundervisning, 1981
 Kvinnorna i Skövde : kvinnor i familj och arbete, i politik och kulturliv i en svensk småstad 1880-1930
 Borgerligt kvinnligt och borgerligt manligt i försvarsrörelsen : en studie i Skövde Tidning - Västgöta Korrespondenten 1870-1920. 
 En doktorsavhandling om den rgelementerade prostitutionen.
 Geijer, liberalismen och kvinnornas medborgarrätt
 Deskriptivt om kvinnlig rösträtt.
 Genrebilder av kvinnor : en studie i hemmens hierarkier, 1983
 "Hvarför skola kvinnor vänta?"
 Tulipanarosor : reformverksamhet och reformverklighet, 1984
 Borgarens fru och arbetarens hustru 
 Männen som stödde kvinnokampen ...
 Giftermål gjorde myndig kvinna omyndig
 Arbetets döttrar. 2, Sociologiska och historiska synpunkter, 1986
 Två skrankor : om kvinnor och utbildning kring sekelskiftet, 1986
 Arbetsdelning, tidsfördelning och kunskapstilldelning : om kvinnors och mäns samhällsvillkor
 Fyra uppsatser om nordiska kvinnliga forskarpionjärer : en kommentar
 Kvinnor och kunskap
 Manliga strukturer och kvinnliga strategier : en bok till Gunhild Kyle, 1987
 Kvinnoliv i staden : II
 The marginalized majority, 1987
 Skrivande kvinnor, 1987
 Genrebilder av kvinnor : en studie i sekelskiftets borgerliga familjehierarkier., 1987
 Kvinnor och kunskap, 1987
 Arbetsdelning, tidsfördelning och kunskapsfördelning : om kvinnors och mäns samhällsvillkor., 1987
 Handbok i svensk kvinnohistoria, 1988
 Gästarbeterska i manssamhället, 1990
 The division of work between the sexes and its social consequences.
 Handbok i svensk kvinnohistoria, 1992
 Kvinnoprofiler, 1993
 Kring franska revolutionen 
 Rätt till röst.
 Kvinnobildning i historiskt perspektiv , 1994
 Mary Wollstonecraft : Mary Wollstonecraft in Sweden 1795-1995 in Uddevalla 2-6 september 1995, 1995
 Kunglig änka på Gripsholm - drottning Maria Eleonora.
 Married and Degraded to Legal Minority The Swedish Married Woman during the Emancipation Period, 1858–1921 , 2004
 Handbok i svensk kvinnohistoria , 2006
 Kvinnoprofiler, 2006

Further reading
  Hundrade och en Göteborgskvinnor / Lisbeth Larsson (red). Arkiv i väst, 0283-4855 ; 22. Göteborg: Riksarkivet, Landsarkivet i Göteborg. 2018. sid. 137–138. Libris 22682935.  (in Swedish)

References

1921 births
2016 deaths
Gender studies academics
People from Gothenburg
20th-century Swedish historians
20th-century Swedish women writers
21st-century Swedish historians
21st-century Swedish women writers
Swedish women historians